The Rawalpindi Parade 1905 was a parade by the British Indian Army held in Rawalpindi, India on 8 December 1905 to honour the Prince and Princess of Wales. The troops were under the Command of Horatio Herbert, Viscount Kitchener of Khartoum, G.C.B., O.M., G.C.M.G., Commander-in-Chief India. The Royal party arrived at the parade ground escorted by a Field Officer's escort of 1st Skinner's Horse. They then received a Royal salute and inspected the troops, accompanied by the Commander-in-chief. On conclusion of the inspection, the troops on parade marched past in the following order.

Order of the march past
Viscount Kitchener of Khartoum, Commander-in-Chief India
Major General Douglas Haig, Inspector-General of Cavalry in India
1st (Peshawar) Infantry Brigade - Major General C. H. Des Voeux
Royal Horse Artillery
F Battery
I Battery
J Battery
T Battery
1st Cavalry Brigade - Brigadier General  Robert Bellew Adams V.C.
22nd Sam Browne's Cavalry
23rd Cavalry
Queens Own Corp of Guides Cavalry
2nd Cavalry Brigade - Colonel F.S. Garratt
12th Royal Lancers
8th Cavalry
9th Hodson's Horse
3rd Cavalry Brigade - Colonel A. Phayre
9th Queen's Royal Lancers
7th Hariana Lancers
11th Prince of Wales Own Lancers
4th Cavalry Brigade - Brigadier General B.T. Mahon
3rd The King's Own Hussars
13th Duke of Connaught's Lancers
15th Lancers (Cureton's Multanis)
Divisional Cavalry Regiments
19th Lancers (Fane's Horse)
1st Duke of York's Own Lancers 
25th Cavalry
12th Cavalry
Mounted Infantry
No. 1 Company 
No. 2 Company	
Royal Artillery Brigadier-General J.A. Coxhead
Royal Field Artillery
1st Brigade
13th Battery
67th Battery
69th Battery
39th Brigade 
46th Battery
51st Battery
54th Battery
45th Brigade
11th Battery
52nd Battery
80th Battery
Royal Garrison Artillery
Mountain Division
5th Mountain Battery
6th Mountain Battery	
8th Mountain Battery	
21st Mountain Battery	
22nd Mountain Battery	
24th Mountain Battery	
26th Mountain Battery	
27th Mountain Battery	
28th Mountain Battery
Royal Garrison Artillery
71st Company (Heavies)	
104th Company (Heavies)	
Sappers and Miners Colonel A.E. Sandbach
1 Company, 1st Sappers and Miners	
2 Company, 1st Sappers and Miners	
4 Company, 1st Sappers and Miners	
5 Company, 1st Sappers and Miners	
9 Company, 1st Sappers and Miners
Telegraph Section, 1st S & M	
2nd S & P
3rd S & M
Telephone Section 1st S & P
1st (Peshawar) Division Lieutent General Sir, E. Barrow
1st Seaforth Highlanders
2nd Gordon Highlanders
36th Sikhs
38th Dogras
2nd (Nowshera) Infantry Brigade - Brigadier General Sir James Willcocks
1st The Cameronians (Scottish Rifles)
25th Punjabis
45th Rattray Sikhs
54th Sikhs
3rd (Frontier) Infantry Brigade - Colonel Fenton Aylmer, V.C.
52nd Sikhs
53rd Sikhs
59th Scinde Rifles
Queens Own Corps of Guides
Divisional Battalion
4th Prince Albert Victor's Rajputs
2nd (Rawalpindi) Division Major General. J.H. Wodehouse
5th (Jhelum) Infantry Brigade - Colonel. Henry Buckley Burton Watkis
25th Punjabis
30th Punjabis
56th Infantry
58th Vaughan's Rifles
6th (Abbottabad) Infantry Brigade - Major General John Blaxell Woon
1st 5th Gurkha Rifles
2nd 5th Gurkha Rifles
1st 6th Gurkha Rifles
2nd 6th Gurkha Rifles
4th (Rawalpindi) Infantry Brigade - Colonel. C.W. Park
1st The Queen's (Royal West Surrey Regiment)	
1st Royal Irish Regiment
1st Royal Munster Fusiliers
2nd Royal Irish Fusiliers
Divisional Battalion
23rd Pioneers
3rd (Lahore) Division Major General Walter Kitchener
7th (Mian Mir) Infantry Brigade - Colonel W. Du Gray
1st Northamptonshire Regiment
20th Duke of Cambridge's Own Infantry (Brownlow's Punjabis)
21st Punjabis
40th Pathans
8th (Ferozepore) Infantry Brigade - Brigadier General H.A. Abbott
1st Dorsetshire Regiment
14th Ferozepore Sikhs
15th Ludhiana Sikhs
19th Punjabis
9th (Baklok) Infantry Brigade - Brigadier General J.A Pollock
1st 1st Gurkha Rifles (The Maluan Regt)
2nd 1st Gurkha Rifles (The Maluan Regt)
1st 4th Gurkha Rifles
2nd 4th Gurkha Rifles
Divisional Battalion
34th Sikh Pioneers
4th (Quetta) Division Major General Sir O'Moore Creagh. V.C.
11th (Derajat) Infantry Brigade - Colonel C.A. Anderson
22nd Punjabis
29th Punjabis
55th Coke's Rifles
78th Moplah Rifles
12 (Garwhal) Infantry Brigade - Major General A.C.F. Browne
2nd King's Royal Rifles
1st Royal Irish Rifles
1st 2nd Prince of Wales Own Gurkha Rifles
2nd 2nd Prince of Wales Own Gurkha Rifles
10th (Sirkind) Infantry Brigade - Major General  R.A.P. Clements
1st Royal Sussex Regiment
1st Gloucestershire Regiment
2nd North Staffordshire Regiment
1st Wiltshire Regiment
Divisional Battalion
32nd Sikh Pioneers

References

Military of British India
History of Rawalpindi
December 1905 events